The Battle of Mogadishu, also known as the Black Hawk Down incident, was part of Operation Gothic Serpent. It was fought on 3–4 October 1993, in Mogadishu, Somalia, between forces of the United States—supported by UNOSOM II—against the forces of the Somali National Alliance (SNA) and armed irregular citizens of south Mogadishu. The battle was part of the broader Somali Civil War that had begun in 1991. The United Nations had initially become involved to provide food aid to alleviate starvation in the south of the country, but in the months preceding the battle, had shifted the mission to establishing democracy and restoring a central government.

Seven months after the deployment of U.S. troops to Somalia, on 5 June 1993, the U.N. suffered its worst loss of its peacekeepers in decades when the Pakistani contingent was attacked while inspecting an SNA weapons storage site. Mohammed Farah Aidid, head of the SNA, became a fugitive after UNOSOM II blamed his faction for the incident and a hunt for him began that characterized most of the U.N. intervention up until the Battle of Mogadishu. As part of the campaign to capture Aidid, U.S. forces in Mogadishu launched the Abdi House raid, on 12 July 1993, resulting in the death of many elders and prominent members of Aidids clan, the Habr Gidr. The raid led many Mogadishu residents to join the fight against UNOSOM II forces and it also led Aidid and the SNA to deliberately attack American personnel for the first time on August 8, 1993, which in turn led President Clinton to dispatch the Task Force Ranger to capture Aidid.

On 3 October 1993, U.S. forces planned to seize two of Aidid's high-ranking lieutenants during a meeting deep in the city. The raid was only intended to last an hour, but morphed into an overnight standoff and rescue operation extending into the daylight hours of the next day. While the goal of the operation was achieved, it was a pyrrhic victory and spiraled into the deadly Battle of Mogadishu. As the operation was ongoing, Somali forces shot down three American Sikorsky UH-60 Black Hawk helicopters using RPG-7s, with two crashing deep in hostile territory. A desperate defense of the two downed helicopters began and fighting lasted through the night to defend the survivors of the crashes. In the morning, a UNOSOMII armored convoy fought their way to the besieged soldiers and withdrew, incurring further casualties but eventually rescuing the survivors.

At the time, the battle caused the most significant loss of U.S. troops since the Vietnam War. Casualties included 18 dead American soldiers and 73 wounded, with Malaysian forces suffering one death and seven wounded, and Pakistani forces suffering one death and two injuries. Owing to the dense urban character of the battle, estimates of Somali casualties greatly vary—with most estimates set between 315 and 2,000 Somali casualties, including civilians.

In the aftermath of the battle, dead American soldiers were dragged through the streets of Mogadishu by enraged Somalis, an act which was broadcast to public outcry on American television. The battle shifted American foreign policy and it eventually led to the pullout of the U.N. mission in 1995. Fear of a repeat of the battle was the reason for America's reluctance to increase its involvement in Somalia and other regions. Some scholars believe that it was a major factor that influenced the Clinton administration's decision not to intervene in the Rwandan genocide, and it has commonly been referred to as "Somalia Syndrome".

Background

In January 1991, Somali President Mohamed Siad Barre was overthrown by a coalition of opposing clans, precipitating the Somali Civil War. The Somali National Army concurrently disbanded, and some former soldiers reconstituted as irregular regional forces or joined the clan militias. The main rebel group in the capital Mogadishu was the United Somali Congress (USC), which later divided into two armed factions: one led by Ali Mahdi Muhammad, who later became president; and the other by Mohamed Farrah Aidid which became known as USC/SNA.

Later that year severe fighting broke out in Mogadishu between Mahdi and Aidid, which continued in the following months and spread throughout the country, resulting in over 20,000 casualties by the end of 1991. The civil war had resulted in the destruction of Somalia's agriculture, which in turn led to starvation in large parts of southern Somalia. The international community began to send food supplies to halt the starvation, but significant amounts were hijacked and brought to local clan leaders, who routinely exchanged it with other countries for weapons. Some estimates placed the amount of food aid being stolen at 80 percent, while other estimates claimed a far lower estimate of 20 percent. Between 1991 and 1992 an estimated 200,000 to 300,000 people died from starvation and another 1.5 million people suffered from it. This situation was further exacerbated by the hijacking of aid convoys and supplies.

Operation Provide Relief began in August 1992, when U.S. President George H. W. Bush announced that U.S. military transports would support the multinational U.N. relief effort in Somalia. Ten C-130s and 400 people were deployed to Mombasa, Kenya, airlifting aid to Somalia's remote areas and reducing reliance on truck convoys. The C-130s delivered 48,000 tons of food and medical supplies in six months to international humanitarian organizations trying to help Somalia's more than three million starving people.

When this proved inadequate to stop the massive death and displacement of the Somali people (500,000 dead and 1.5 million refugees or displaced), the U.S. launched a major coalition operation to assist and protect humanitarian activities in December 1992. This operation, called Restore Hope, saw the U.S. assuming the unified command in accordance with Resolution 794. The U.S. Marine Corps landed the 15th Marine Expeditionary Unit (Special Operations Capable) in Mogadishu with elements of 2nd Battalion 9th Marines and 3rd Battalion 11th Marines and secured key facilities within two weeks, intending to facilitate humanitarian actions. Elements of the 2nd Battalion 9th Marines HMLA-369 (Marine Light Attack Helicopter Squadron 369 of Marine Aircraft Group 39, 3rd Marine Aircraft Wing, Camp Pendleton); 9th Marines; quickly secured routes to Baidoa, Balidogle and Kismayo, then were reinforced by the U.S. Army's 10th Mountain Division.

The United Nations' intervention, backed by U.S. Marines, has been credited with helping end the famine in Somalia, though the starvation had been improving in the worst affected areas before any significant deployment of troops. According to an estimate made in November 1994 by the Washington-based Refugee Policy Group NGO, approximately 100,000 lives were saved as a result of international assistance,  10,000 of which had been saved following the deployment of U.S. troops in December 1992.

Mission shift
On 3 March 1993, U.N. Secretary-General Boutros Boutros-Ghali submitted to the U.N. Security Council his recommendations for effecting the transition from UNITAF to UNOSOM II. He indicated that since Resolution 794's adoption in December 1992, UNITAF's presence and operations had created a positive impact on Somalia's security situation and on the effective delivery of humanitarian assistance (UNITAF deployed 37,000 personnel over forty percent of southern and central Somalia). There was still no effective government, police, or national army, resulting in serious security threats to U.N. personnel. To that end, the Security Council authorized UNOSOM II to establish a secure environment throughout Somalia, to achieve national reconciliation so as to create a democratic state.

At the Conference on National Reconciliation in Somalia, held on 15 March 1993, in Addis Ababa, Ethiopia, all fifteen Somali parties agreed to the terms set out to restore peace and democracy. Within a month or so, however, by May 1993, it became clear that, although a signatory to the March Agreement, Mohammed Farrah Aidid's faction would not cooperate in the Agreement's implementation.

Attack on Pakistanis and hunt for Aidid 

On 5 June 1993 Aidid's militia and Somali citizens at Radio Mogadishu attacked the Pakistani force that had been tasked with the inspection of an arms cache located at the station, out of fear that the United Nations forces had been sent to shut down the SNAs broadcast infrastructure. Radio was the most popular medium for news in Somalia, and consequently control of the airwaves was considered vital to both the SNA and UNOSOM. Radio Mogadishu was a highly popular station with the residents of Mogadishu, and rumors that the United Nations was planning to seize or destroy it had been abound for days before 5 June. On May 31, 1993, Aidid's political rivals met with the top UNOSOM official and attempted to convince him to take over Radio Mogadishu, a meeting Aidid was made well aware of.

According to the 1994 United Nations Inquiry in the events leading up to the Battle of Mogadishu:"Opinions differ, even among UNOSOM officials, on whether the weapons inspections of 5 June 1993 was genuine or was merely a cover-up for reconnaissance and subsequent seizure of Radio Mogadishu." What transpired after marked a seminal moment in the UNOSOM II operation. The Pakistani forces suffered 24 dead and 57 wounded, as well as one wounded Italian and three wounded American soldiers.

In response, on 6 June 1993, the outraged U.N. Security Council passed Resolution 837, a call for the arrest and prosecution of the persons responsible for the death and wounding of the peacekeepers. Though the Resolution 837 did not specifically mention or point out Aidid, it held the Somali National Alliance responsible. Being chairman of the organization, the hunt for Aidid characterized most of the U.N. intervention from that point on up until the Battle of Mogadishu.

A $25,000 warrant was issued by Admiral Jonathan Howe for information leading to Aidid's arrest and UNOSOM forces began attacking targets all over Mogadishu in hopes of finding him.

Bloody Monday raid
On the morning of 12 July 1993, a strike by the 10th Mountain Division of the QRF in Mogadishu led to the Abdi House raid. As part of the campaign to capture or kill Aidid following the attack on the Pakistanis, American forces under U.N. authorization attacked the "Abdi House", a villa belonging to Aidid's Interior Minister, Abdi Hasan Awale, during a major gathering of prominent Somalis and high-ranking elders of the Habr Gidr and other Hawiye subclans. According to UNOSOM, participating in the conference were hard-liners and close advisers to Aidid who had been responsible for attacks on UN forces. 

At 10:18 in the morning, six American Cobra attack helicopters fired into the summit just as it had begun. The reason for the meeting, how many people were killed and even the very inhabitants of the house at the time is disputed by American and U.N. officials who said that the conference was gathering of an SNA war council, and that their mission was a successful military strike. According to the SNA, survivors, and witnesses, and corroborated by multiple aid and justice organizations such Human Rights Watch and Doctors Without Borders, along with journalists present in Mogadishu, such as American war correspondent Scott Peterson—a large group of prominent Habr Gidr members (along with members of other Hawiye subclans) and clan elders had gathered at a villa to discuss a peace initiative to end the four-month conflict between the SNA and UNOSOM. According to Peterson, the gathering had been publicized in newspapers the day before the attack as a peace gathering, but according to Admiral Jonathan Howe, "The meeting of clan elders seeking peaceful solutions was several blocks away [from the Abdi house meeting]." Black Hawk Down author Mark Bowden, after a series of interviews with Adm. Howe, noted that he disputed Howe's assertion that the clan elders had been meeting at another location.

According to U.N. officials, the attack was timed to kill Aidid's chief lieutenants and carried out accurately, with damage and casualties confined to the compound. Officials described the attack as a blow to the SNA's command structure, and a set back for the hardliners, opening the way for more cooperative members to take power. According to U.N. officials, the attack killed 13 people, including several of Aidid's high-level commanders and those responsible for the 5 June attack on the Pakistanis. The legal department of the U.N. mission to Somalia contested the legality and conduct of the raid. UNOSOM's top justice official in Somalia, Ann Wright, resigned after arguing that the raid had been "nothing less than murder committed in the name of the United Nations" in a memo to Admiral Howe. A Human Rights Watch report argued that UNOSOM had produced no evidence to substantiate its claims about the raid.

According to the Red Cross, there were 215 Somalis casualties, though they were only able to survey the dead and injured in the aftermath of the attack at only two of the hospitals in Mogadishu. A spokesman for Aidid, said 73 were killed including many prominent clan elders, a charge UNOSOM denied. Mark Bowden noted that every eyewitness he interviewed placed the number of dead at 70 or more and that former ambassador and U.S. special envoy to Somalia Robert B. Oakley accepted this figure. He further noted that many of those interviewed, including non Somalis aid workers, would say that many of those killed in the attack had been well-respected Habr Gidr moderates opposed to Aidid. Regardless of the meetings true intent, the attack is generally considered as the most significant of the many incidents that occurred in 1993 that caused many Somalis to turn against UNOSOM II, especially the U.S. contingent.

Numerous aid and human rights organizations, especially Doctors Without Borders criticized the raid. The president of the organization, Rony Brauman declared that, "For the first time in Somalia there has been a killing under the flag of humanitarianism." Numerous high-ranking personnel of the agency claimed that many at the 12 July meeting had been well-respected representatives from civil society who could have displaced Aidid and further noted that the highest ranking Somali administrator for the city of Merca had been killed at the meeting. Human Rights Watch declared that the attack "looked like mass murder" and an American reporter who was present on the scene said that the raid was far deadlier than U.S. and U.N. officials acknowledged. Mark Bowden argued that the raid marked a serious escalation of the conflict in Somalia and was "a monumental misjudgment" and "tragic mistake". The footage recorded of the incident by a Somali cameraman was considered so disturbing that CNN deemed it too graphic to show on air to the American public. Multiple foreign journalists who traveled to the site of the raid were attacked by an angry mob. Five journalists were killed, resulting in the pullout of numerous media organizations in Mogadishu which contributed to the lack of coverage of the October 3–4 battle.

In the view of Robert B. Oakley, "Before July 12th, the U.S. would have been attacked only because of association with the UN, but the U.S. was never singled out until after July 12th". The strike was the first time the U.N. forces in Somalia had specifically targeted people instead of armaments caches, marking a turning point in what had been a low intensity conflict. In the two and half years since the civil war had started, Bloody Monday represented the single deadliest attack in Mogadishu. To the Habr Gidr, including the former moderates and even other clans that had opposed them during the civil war, the raid marked the beginning of war with the American contingent, which culminated in the Battle of Mogadishu three months later. The events of Bloody Monday ledAidid to make the decision to specifically target American soldiers for the first time and resulted in the 8 August killings of U.S. troops that pushed President Clinton to send in extra troops to capture him.

The August killings and the deployment of Task Force Ranger

In the three weeks following the events of Bloody Monday there was a large lull in UNOSOM operations in Mogadishu, as the city had become incredibly hostile to foreign troops. Then on 8 August, in an area of the city that had been considered "relatively safe to travel in", the SNA detonated a bomb against a U.S. military Humvee, killing four soldiers. A total of only three American soldiers had died in the intervention, marking the 8 August incident as the largest single killing of U.S. troops in Somalia so far.Two weeks later another bomb injured seven more. In response, U.S. President Bill Clinton approved the proposal to deploy a special task force composed of elite special forces units, including 400 U.S. Army Rangers and Delta Force operators.

On 22 August 1993, the unit deployed to Somalia under the command of Major General William F. Garrison, commander of the special multi-disciplinary Joint Special Operations Command (JSOC) at the time.

The force consisted of:
 B Company, 3rd Battalion, 75th Ranger Regiment under the command of Captain Michael D. Steele;
 C Squadron, 1st Special Forces Operational Detachment-Delta (1st SFOD-D) under the command of Lt Col Gary L. Harrell;
 A deployment package of 16 helicopters and personnel from the 1st Battalion, 160th Special Operations Aviation Regiment (160th SOAR), which included MH-60 Black Hawks and AH/MH-6 Little Birds;
 Navy SEALs from the Naval Special Warfare Development Group (DEVGRU);
 Air Force Pararescuemen and Combat Controllers from the 24th Special Tactics Squadron.

Prior Black Hawk shot down
A week before the Battle of Mogadishu, at 2:00 a.m. on 25 September 1993, the SNA used an RPG to shoot down a Black Hawk (callsign Courage 53) while it was on patrol. The pilots were able to fly their burning Black Hawk away from Aideed's turf to the more UNOSOM friendly port of Mogadishu and make a crash landing. The pilot and co-pilot survived, but three crew members were killed. A shootout ensued as peacekeepers fought to the helicopter. The attack had not been the first time that September that Somali militia had managed to hit  helicopters with RPG fire, but it was the first time they had used the tactic to take one down and the event was a propaganda victory for the SNA.

The chief UNOSOM II spokesman in Mogadishu, U.S. Army Maj. David Stockwell, referred to the downing as "a very lucky shot."

Order of battle

U.S. and UNOSOM
Units involved in the battle:
 Task Force Ranger, including:
 C Squadron, 1st Special Forces Operational Detachment-Delta (1st SFOD-D) – aka Delta Force
 Bravo Company, 3rd Ranger Battalion, 75th Ranger Regiment
 1st Battalion, 160th Special Operations Aviation Regiment (Airborne) (The Night Stalkers) with MH-6J and AH-6 "Little Birds" and MH-60 A/L Black Hawks
 Combat Controllers and Pararescuemen from the 24th Special Tactics Squadron
 Navy SEALs from the Naval Special Warfare Development Group (DEVGRU)
 CVN-72 USS Abraham Lincoln & Carrier Air Wing 11
 Amphibious Squadron 5 (USS New Orleans, USS Denver, USS Comstock, USS Cayuga)
 BLT 1/9 Battalion Landing Team 1st Battalion/ 9th Marines/ 13th MEU (Marine Expeditionary Unit/ USS New Orleans LPH-11 ARG (Amphibious Ready Group)
 Task Force-10th Mountain Division, including:
 2nd Battalion "Attack", 25th Aviation Regiment
 1st Battalion, 22nd Infantry Regiment
 2nd Battalion, 14th Infantry Regiment
 3rd platoon, C Company, 1st Battalion, 87th Infantry Regiment
 41st Engineer Battalion, 10th Mountain Division
 15th Battalion, of the Frontier Force Regiment, Pakistan Army
 19th Lancers of the Pakistan Army
 10th Battalion, of the Baloch Regiment of Pakistan Army
 977th Military Police Company
 United Nations Operation in Somalia II:
 19th Battalion, Royal Malay Regiment of the Malaysian Army
 11th Regiment, Grup Gerak Khas of the Malaysian Army (few GGK operators during rescue the Super 6-1 crews)
 7th Battalion, Frontier Force Regiment of the Pakistan Army

Somali National Alliance and Irregular forces
The Somali National Alliance (SNA) was formed in June 1992, following a successful defence by many factions against an offensive by Somali dictator Siad Barres, in his attempt to retake Mogadishu. During the UNOSOM hunt for Aidid, the SNA was composed of multiple political organizations such as, Col. Omar Gess' Somali Patriotic Movement, the Somali Democratic Movement, the combined Digil and Mirifleh clans, the Habr Gedir of the United Somali Congress headed by Aidid, and the newly established Southern Somali National Movement.

The size and organizational structure of the Somali militia forces involved in the battle are not known in detail. In all, an estimated 1,500–4,000 regular faction members are believed to have participated, almost all of whom belonged to Aidid's Somali National Alliance. They drew largely from his Habar Gidir sub-clan of the Hawiye, who began fighting U.S. troops following 12 July 1993.Colonel Sharif Hassan Giumale, Deputy Commander of the SNA High Commission on Defense, was the tactical commander who directly commanded the operations of Somali National Alliance troops on the ground during the Battle of Mogadishu. Giumale, a 45-year-old former Somali army officer and brigade commander, had attended a Soviet military academy in Odessa and had later gone to Italy for further study. He had gathered significant combat experience serving in the Somali National Army during the Ogaden War with Ethiopia in the late 1970s and following the outbreak of the civil war in 1991. Many of the tactics Aidid, Giumale and other subordinate SNA commanders drew on were inspired by Chinese and Vietnamese books on guerilla warfare and on advice from mujahedeen veterans, who had just won the Soviet–Afghan War.Despite the substantial array of heavier weaponry in its stockpiles, none were utilized during the October 3–4 battle. SNA forces were primarily equipped with light infantry weaponry, like the AK-47 assault rifle. Experienced fighters supplemented the main forces with RPG-7 grenade launchers, sniper rifles, mortars, mines and machine guns.

Irregular Somali forces/Volunteers 
During the October 3–4 battle SNA forces also fought alongside hundreds of irregulars or "volunteers" as referred to by U.S. Special Envoy to Somalia Robert B. Oakley, composed mostly of untrained civilians-turned-combatants, many of whom were women and children who had grievances against UNOSOM troops. Human rights abuses and killings by peacekeepers, U.S. military airstrikes in heavily populated neighborhoods resulting in civilian casualties, forced evictions for UN compound expansions and the difficulty of receiving legal recourse for wrongs committed by United Nations forces all inflamed the growing animosity of the civilian population of Mogadishu. According to a witness account from American journalist Scott Peterson, in the days preceding the battle, renewed Somali anger against UNOSOM troops had been building following an incident where American mortar crews had fired shells into the dense neighborhoods surrounding their base—resulting in the death of family of 8 and injuring 34, enraging the citizens of South Mogadishu.

Large numbers of Somalis not affiliated with the SNA spontaneously joined the fight alongside the SNA during the battle, as small arms were widely distributed and among the civilian population of Mogadishu. The irregulars often complicated the situation on the ground for SNA commanders, as they were not controllable and often got in the way by demanding ammunition and burdening the militia's medical evacuation system. A significant element of the volunteers consisted of seniors, women and children who utilized small arms. Many volunteers did not actually take part in combat, but instead operated as reconnaissance or runners for SNA troops.

Remarkably, many of the volunteers during the Battle of Mogadishu came from rival clans, to the extent where members of the Abgal and Habar Gidr clans, who had destroyed large swathes of Mogadishu fighting each other only a few months earlier, fought side by side against UNOSOM forces.

Planning 

On the morning of 3 October 1993, a locally recruited intelligence asset reported to the CIA that two of Aidids principal advisors in the SNA, Omar Salad Elmi and Abdi Hassan Awale, would be meeting near the Olympic Hotel. The asset further reported that Aidid and other high-ranking figures would possibly be present. The Olympic Hotel and the surrounding Bakara market was considered to be Habr Gidr territory and incredibly hostile, as the clan made up a significant composition of the Somali National Alliances militia. UNOSOM forces had refused to enter the area during previous engagements with the SNA.

The plan to capture the targets was relatively straightforward. First, the Somali CIA asset would drive to the site of the meeting and then open the hood of his vehicle to confirm the exact building to raid for observing surveillance aircraft. Delta operators would then assault the target building using MH-6 Little Bird helicopters, and secure the targets inside the building. Four Ranger chalks under Captain Michael D. Steele's command would fast-rope down from hovering MH-60L Black Hawks. The Rangers would then create a four-corner defensive perimeter around the target building to isolate it and ensure that no enemy could get in or out. Fast-roping was deemed necessary for the raid as the Black Hawks had no suitable landing zone to deploy troops.

Special operations forces consisting of Bravo Company 3rd Battalion, the 75th Ranger Regiment, the 1st Special Forces Operational Detachment-Delta, and the 160th Aviation Battalion, would be sent to capture Omar Salad Elmi and Mohamed Hassan Awale. A column of twelve vehicles (nine Humvees and three M939 trucks) under the command Lieutenant Colonel Danny McKnight's would arrive at the building to take the entire assault team and their prisoners back to base. The entire operation was estimated to take no longer than 30 minutes.

SNA defence strategy 
The Somali National Alliance had divided South Mogadishu into 18 military sectors, each with its own field officer on alert at all times and a radio network linking them together. The SNA had an excellent grasp of the area around the Olympic Hotel, as it was their home turf, and had created an effective mobilization system that allowed commanders to quickly mass troops within 30 minutes into any area of South Mogadishu .

Col. Sharif Hassan Giumale had carefully analyzed Task Force Ranger's previous six operations in Mogadishu and attempted to adapt the lessons he had learned from the civil war and from his extensive reading on guerrilla insurgencies, particularly the FLMN in El Salvador—who had developed anti-aircraft tactics with infantry weapons, to the conflict with UNOSOM. After close observation, he had hypothesized the American raids clearly stressed speed, so the SNA had to react more quickly. It was clear that the Americans greatest technological advantage in Mogadishu—and its Achilles' heel, the helicopter, had to be neutralized during one of the ranger raids. This would completely negate the American element of speed and surprise, which would consequently draw them into a protracted fight with his troops. An attacking force of militia would then surround the target and offset the superior American firepower with sheer numbers. Ambushes and barricades would be utilized in order to impede UNOSOM reinforcements.

Knowing U.S. special forces considered themselves elite, Giumale believed that they were hubristically underrating the tactical capacity of SNA fighters, who had accrued months of urban fighting experience in the streets of Mogadishu. According to Washington Post reporter Rick Atkinson, the majority of U.S. commanders in Mogadishu had underestimated the number of rocket-propelled grenades available to the SNA, and misjudged the threat they posed to helicopters.

Raid 
At 13:50, Task Force Ranger analysts received intelligence of Omar Salad's location. The soldiers, vehicle convoys, and helicopters were on stand by at Mogadishu International Airport until the code word "Irene" was called across all the radio channels by command, signaling the commencement of the operation. Lead by the MH-6 Little Birds, an armada of sixteen helicopters took off from the airport to make the approximately four minute flight to the target site. In an attempt to deceive Somali forces, the formation flew past the target before turning around en masse. American aircrew noticed soon after takeoff that Somalis had started to light burning tires around the city, a tactic the SNA had previously used to signal incursions and initiate counterattacks.

At 15:42, the MH-6 assault Little Birds carrying the Delta operators hit the target, the wave of dust becoming so bad that one was forced to go around again and land out of position. Almost immediately after the first landing pilot began noticing small arms fire. Then, two Black Hawks carrying the second Delta assault team led by Delta Captain Austin S. Miller came into position and dropped their teams as the four Ranger chalks prepared to rope onto the four corners surrounding the target building. Chalk Four being carried by Black Hawk Super 67, piloted by CW3 Jeff Niklaus, was accidentally put a block north of their intended point. Declining the pilot's offer to move them back down due to the time it would take to do so, leaving the helicopter too exposed, Chalk Four intended to move down to the planned position, but intense ground fire prevented them from doing so.

According to Somali National Alliance officials there was a 10-minute period of panic and confusion following the arrival of the Black Hawks, but after getting a basic understanding of the situation, SNA Col. Sharif Hassan Giumale gave out the order over radio to officers across Mogadishu to start converging on the site of the battle and to begin organizing ambushes along likely reinforcement routes from the UNOSOM bases. 10 minutes later, the roads surrounding the Olympic Hotel were covered with militia and nearly sealed. Groups of SNA platoons arriving from other parts of South Mogadishu would quickly begin splintering into a half-dozen squads of about six or seven men. Following the initial call to arms, the SNA commanders ceased radio transmissions, cognizant that the Americans had the ability to jam and intercept their communications, opting to instead rely on hand written dispatches and couriers.The ground-extraction convoy was supposed to reach the captive targets a few minutes after the operation's beginning, but it ran into delays. Somali citizens and local militia formed barricades along Mogadishu's streets with rocks, wreckage, rubbish and burning tires, impeding the convoy from reaching the Rangers and their captives. Eventually it arrived ten minutes later near the Olympic Hotel, down the street from target building and waited for Delta and Rangers to complete their mission.

During the operation's first moments, Private First Class Todd Blackburn lost his grip while fast-roping from Super 67 as it hovered, and fell  onto the street. Blackburn received severe injuries and required evacuation by a column of three Humvees. While taking Blackburn back to base, Sergeant Dominick Pilla, assigned to one of the Humvees being pelted with heavy fire from the surrounding buildings, was killed instantly when a bullet struck his head, marking the first American death of the battle.

Witnesses reported the Humvee column arrived back at base, riddled with bullet holes and emitting smoke from the barrage of heavy fire it had received.

First Black Hawk down 
About 40 minutes after the assault began, one of the Black Hawks, Super 61, piloted by CW3 Cliff "Elvis" Wolcott, was struck by an RPG-7 which sent the helicopter into an uncontrollable spin. The helicopter would violently crash into a residential area, coming to rest on a building wall, in an alleyway about 300 yards east of the target building. Both pilots were killed in the resulting crash and two of the crew (Staff Sgt. Ray Dowdy and Staff Sgt. Charlie Warren) were severely wounded. Two snipers, Staff Sergeant Daniel Busch and Sergeant Jim Smith, survived the crash and began defending the crash site.

SNA soldiers in the area began calling out local residents, shouting on megaphones, "Come out and defend your homes!" The militia fighters, in organized squads, quickly began to fan in and out of nearby buildings, alleys and trees to avoid the Little Bird helicopters converging to cover the wreck of Super 61. A nearby MH-6 Little Bird, Star 41, quickly flew down to the Black Hawk crash site. The pilot, CW3 Karl Maier, steadied the controls in his left hand and fired a machine gun with his right, while the copilot, CW4 Keith Jones, dashed into the alley and helped the two Delta snipers, one of them mortally wounded, into the back of their helicopter.

A combat search and rescue (CSAR) team was dispatched via Black Hawk Super 68. Led by Delta Captain Bill J. Coultrup. the 15 man CSAR (USAF Sergeant Scott C. Fales, and USAF Sergeant Timothy A. Wilkinson, and USAF Staff Sergeant Jeffrey W. Bray) team were able to fast rope down to the Super 61 crash site. While the last two men were rappelling, the Black Hawk took a direct RPG hit from SNA militia, almost totally severing the main rotor blades. Super 68, piloted by CW3 Dan Jollota and Maj. Herb Rodriguez, was able to survive the hit and quickly limped back to base.

The CSAR team found both the pilots dead and two wounded inside the crashed helicopter. Under intense fire, the team moved the wounded men to a nearby collection point, where they built a makeshift shelter using kevlar armor plates salvaged from Super 61s wreckage. Communications were confused between the ground convoy and the assault team. The assault team and the ground convoy waited for 20 minutes to receive their orders to move out. Both units were under the mistaken impression that they were to be first contacted by the other.

Second Black Hawk down 
Yusuf Dahir Mo'alim, an SNA commander of a seven-man RPG team, was slowly moving up towards the first crash site when they caught sight of a second Black Hawk helicopter. One of the men in Mo'alims squad knelt down on the road, aimed at the tail rotor and fired. The RPG connected with the tail rotor and the helicopter at first seemed to be fine. A few moments later the rotor assembly disintegrated and the helicopter began to lurch forward. It then started violently spinning and proceeded to drop 100 feet, slamming into the street and eliciting a cheer from the large crowd of Somali citizens gathering on the nearby streets. The Black Hawk had been callsign Super 64, piloted by Michael Durant. They had been hit while orbiting almost directly over the wreckage of Super 61 at around 16:40 and crashed in an upright position into a group of tin shacks, narrowly avoiding the large buildings in the area. When Super 64 impacted the ground, multiple homes were destroyed and numerous Somalis in the area were killed by flying debris. Enraged local residents who had seen the crash amassed in crowd surged toward Super 64.In the half hour following the loss of Super 64, desperate U.S. commanders unsuccessfully attempted to relieve the besieged troops. A small Ranger relief column was dispatched from the airfield, only to have two Humvees wiped out (resulting in the death of three soldiers) after driving just one kilometer away from the base. SNA commanders had anticipated the American response and had set up numerous coordinated ambushes. A few minutes later, Charlie Company of 10th Mountain Divisions Quick Reaction Force also tried to leave but was ambushed on Via Lenin road by SNA militia. In the break out attempt approximately 100 U.S. soldiers fired nearly 60,000 rounds of ammunition and used hundreds of grenades in 30 minutes before being forced to withdraw back to the airfield. Due to constant ambushes and incessant Somali resistance, it would take an additional nine hours for the QRF ground forces to eventually reach the besieged troops.

At the second crash site, two Delta snipers, Master Sergeant Gary Gordon and Sergeant First Class Randy Shughart, were inserted by Black Hawk Super 62. Their first two requests to be inserted were denied, but they were finally granted permission after their third and final request came following the news of the ambush on the QRF troops attempting to leave the airfield. After 10 minutes of Super 62 giving fire support to the Delta snipers, an RPG slammed into the cockpit, ripping straight through the engine and knocking the copilot unconscious. Despite the damage, Super 62, piloted by CWO Mike Goffena, was able to vacate the area and make a crash landing a safe distance away from the battle.

Lacking fire support, the snipers were overrun and Gordon was fatally wounded, Shughart picked up Gordon's CAR-15 and gave it to Durant. Shughart went back around the helicopter's nose and held off the crowd for approximately 10 more minutes before he was killed. For their actions, MSG Gordon and SFC Shughart were posthumously awarded the Medal of Honor, the first awarded since the Vietnam War. The crash site was then overran and all the crew members were killed except Durant. He had nearly been beaten to death, only to be captured by Yusuf Dahir Mo'alim.

Defence of crash sites 
Back at the first crash site, about 90 Rangers and Delta Force operators found themselves under heavy Somali fire. Despite air support, the assault team was effectively trapped for the night. The Rangers and Delta had spread over a two-block area and were engaged in close combat against fighters who were sometimes only a door away. Seeking shelter from the kill zone and a place to safeguard their wounded, the Americans had occupied four houses on Freedom Road, detaining about 20 Somalis who lived there. Several children were locked alone in the bathroom until soldiers let them rejoin their mothers, who would later allege that they had been handcuffed by the Americans.

At 6:40 p.m., Col. Sharif Hassan Giumale, in charge of managing the majority of the Somali forces on the ground, received written instruction from Aidid to repel any reinforcements and take all measures necessary to prevent the Americans from escaping. Approximately 360 militiamen had encircled the first helicopter, along with hundreds of other armed Somalis volunteers and irregulars not associated with the SNA.

Knowing the Americans were well entrenched in defensive positions they had taken on the four houses on Freedom Road, Col. Giumale ordered six 60mm mortars emplaced between 21 October Road and Armed Forces Street to obliterate the buildings. Before the assault was carried out an SNA officer came to Col. Giumale with the relatives of the Somalis detained in the homes and warned that there were women and children present in the building. Following the news of the civilian presence, Giumale sent a dispatch to another SNA commander, Col. Hashi Ali, that the mortars were to be held in abeyance except to harass UNOSOM reinforcements. Aidid would later send a dispatch agreeing with Giumales decision to halt the mortars, as he did not want the local civilian population to turn against the SNA. American officers who were later made privy Giumale's decision conceded that the presence of the civilians prevented an attack, but disputed the notion that the mortars were powerful enough to wipe out Task Force Ranger. They contended that anti-mortar radar and Little Bird helicopters would have likely destroyed any mortar position after only firing one or two rounds. The SNA alleged that the Americans had used Somali civilians as human shields to protect themselves, a charge which American officials vehemently denied and countered that the civilians were not hostages.

While the U.S. forces waiting for relief held their position in the homes, AH-6 Little Birds, working in pairs and flying all night long, constantly strafed and pushed back the creeping forces of militia and have consequently been credited with keeping besieged Americans alive until dawn. As night came many of the volunteers and irregulars would depart from the battle, leaving the experienced SNA fighters behind, American soldiers would notice that the shooting became less frequent but far more accurate. An American participant in firefight would later remark, "They used concealment very well. Usually all you saw of a shooter was the barrel of his weapon and his head."

Relief convoy arrives 
Around 02:00, a 70 vehicle Malaysian and Pakistani U.N. relief convoy, accompanied by U.S. troops, arrived at the first crash site. No contingency planning or coordination with U.N. forces had been arranged prior to the operation; consequently, the recovery of the surrounded American troops was significantly complicated and delayed. The mission had been kept secret even from top UN commanders, out of fear of tipping off Somali informants. When the convoy finally pushed into the city, it consisted of more than 100 U.N. vehicles including Malaysian forces' German-made Condor APCs, four Pakistani tanks (M48s), American HMMWVs and several M939 five-ton flatbed trucks. This two-mile-long column was supported by several additional Black Hawks and Cobra assault helicopters stationed with the 10th Mountain Division. Meanwhile, Task Force Ranger's "Little Birds" continued their defense of Super 61 downed crew and rescuers. The relief force sustained heavy casualties, including several killed, and a Malaysian soldier died when an RPG hit his Condor vehicle.

Mogadishu Mile and conclusion

Though Mohamed Farah Aidid had hours earlier given the order to Colonel Sharif Hassan Giumale to prevent the escape of any American soldiers, he had begun to become increasingly concerned with the mounting Somali death toll and the prospect of a severe and endless cycle of retaliation if the remaining U.S. troops holding out were killed by his militia. With Durant now in his possession as hostage, Aidid later claimed in interview with journalists to have ordered a corridor to be opened up for the Americans as dawn broke. Despite Aidid's command, U.N. forces faced fierce shooting until they withdrew from the SNA's zone of control.

While leaving the crash site, a group of Rangers and Delta operators led by SSG John R. Dycus realized that there was no room left in the vehicles for them and instead used the vehicles as cover. Forced to depart the city on foot, they proceeded to a rendezvous point at the intersection of Hawlwadig Road and National Street. This has been commonly referred to as the "Mogadishu Mile". In the last few panicked minutes of the battle, with the convoy operating in a long column with staggered stops and starts, some vehicles ended up making a dash to the stadium, accidentally leaving behind soldiers and forcing them to trek on foot. As the convoy drove back to base AH-1 Cobras and Little Birds provided covering fire overhead while Pakistani tanks fired at any buildings in the city where they had received hostile fire.

Ten minutes later, the convoy reached the safety of the Pakistani base and a field medical hospital set up. The battle was over by 06:30 on Monday, 4 October. U.S. forces were finally evacuated to the U.N. base by the armored convoy. By 7 am, all survivors had reached safety at an aid station inside the stadium on 21 October Road.

Aftermath
After the battle, the bodies of several of the conflict's U.S. casualties (Black Hawk Super 64 crewmembers and their defenders, Delta Force soldiers MSG Gordon and SFC Shughart) were dragged through Mogadishu's streets by a large crowd of Somalis.

After being asked to justify the incident in an interview with American television, Captain Haad of Somali National Alliance claimed that the bodies of the U.S. soldiers had been dragged through the streets by enraged civilians/irregulars who had lost dozens of friends and family, and that the actual SNA soldiers had not partaken in the incident. He would further point to the July 12, 1993, Abdi House Raid that had first led the SNA to begin target U.S. soldiers saying, "Wouldn't you be very sorry about 73 of our elder men, of our religious leaders, of our most prominent people, having their bodies mutilated—we collected parts of their bodies from the building in which they were attacked—if you were a son of one of those people killed on that day, what would be your situation, how would you feel?"

Through negotiation and threats to the Habr Gidir clan leaders by the U.S. Special Envoy for Somalia, Robert B. Oakley, all the bodies were eventually recovered. The bodies were returned in poor condition, one with a severed head. Michael Durant was released after 11 days of captivity. On the beach near the base, a memorial was held for those who were killed in combat. Three months later all Somali prisoners in U.N. custody were released including Aidid's lieutenants Omar Salad Elmi and Mohamed Hassan Awale, who had been the targets of the 3 October raid.

Result of battle 
Two weeks after the battle, General Garrison, in a handwritten letter to President Clinton, took full responsibility for the battle's outcome. He would argue that Task Force Ranger had met their objective—capturing the targets of value. General Garrison had noted before the Battle of Mogadishu that if a serious firefight was had with the SNA, "...we'll win the gunfight, but we might lose the war."

The SNA leadership had the express goal of expelling U.S. forces from Somalia following the Abdi House Raid, and knew that the Americans would not be able tolerate casualties, especially in a conflict they had no real stake. They believed that inflicting any notable casualties on the Americans would cause Congress and the public to turn against participation in UNOSOM II and withdraw from Somalia. The SNA's objective was not to achieve a tactical military victory against the Americans and UNOSOM, but to sap their will to continue fighting and force a complete disengagement from Somalia. Historian Stephen Biddle noted, "it was the UN, not the SNA, that disengaged to end the fighting. The relief column that ultimately extracted TF Ranger had to fight its way into and out of the Bakara Market; SNA fighters were resisting fiercely until UN forces crossed out of Aideed's zone of control and withdrew to their bases." In Losing Mogadishu: Testing US Policy in Somalia, Johnathan Stevenson argued that the Americans had not recognized that, much like the North Vietnamese guerillas, the Somali National Alliance was deliberately executing a military philosophy of attrition in order to achieve victory in spite of a high kill ratio, knowing they could absorb far more losses than the Americans would be able to tolerate.

Known casualties and losses

Somalia
The Somali casualties were a mixture of militiamen, irregulars/volunteers, and local civilians, and the exact number of dead is unknown. Estimates greatly vary from several hundred to several thousand militiamen and civilians killed, with injuries around 1,000–4,000. The Somali casualties were reported in The Washington Post as 312 killed and 814 wounded. Mark Bowden's book Black Hawk Down estimates more than 700 Somali militiamen dead and more than 1,000 wounded. The SNA claimed a much lower casualty rate acknowledging only 133 troops killed in the whole battle. Aidid himself claimed that only 315—civilians and militia—were killed and 812 wounded.

Somali civilians suffered heavy casualties due to the dense urban character of the portion of Mogadishu that fighting took place in. According to Captain Haad of the Somali National Alliance, the civilian death toll was "...almost uncountable, because the place where the fire took place is one of the busiest sectors of Mogadishu...each bullet fired in one direction might have killed four or five or six persons, because the place is very populous." The International Committee of the Red Cross estimated that 200 Somali civilians were killed and several hundred wounded in the fighting. According to American war correspondent Scott Peterson, approximately a third of all the Somali casualties were women and children.

The non-SNA volunteers, mostly untrained civilians turned combatant with grievances against UNOSOM troops, were a significant issue for Somali National Alliance commanders as they complicated situation on the ground and often got themselves killed with their inexperience. Experienced soldiers were seen pleading with enraged crowds of Somalis not to go near the crash sites as the Americans were spraying into the approaching masses. One high-ranking SNA official complained after the battle, "...everybody tried to attack, they came this way, they went that way. If people had left it to the militia and the officers, it would have been no problem."

Ambassador Robert B. Oakley, the U.S. special representative to Somalia, is quoted as saying: "My own personal estimate is that there must have been 1,500 to 2,000 Somalis killed and wounded that day, because that battle was a true battle...Helicopter gunships were being used as well as all sorts of automatic weapons on the ground by the U.S. and the United Nations. The Somalis, by and large, were using automatic rifles and grenade launchers and it was a very nasty fight, as intense as almost any battle you would find."

Most of the Somalis death toll is attributed to the numerous helicopter gunship runs in the narrow alleyways of Mogadishu made by MH-6 Little Birds in support of the U.S. ground forces.

United States
At the time the battle was the deadliest fight involving U.S. troops since the Vietnam War. Two days after, a 19th soldier, Delta operator SFC Matt Rierson, was killed in a mortar attack. That same day, a team on special mission Super 64 incurred two wounded.

Though the Pentagon initially reported the five American soldiers had been killed, in all, 19 U.S. soldiers were killed in action during the battle, and another 73 were wounded in action.

Pakistan 
One Pakistani soldier was killed and 10 disappeared during the rescue attempt and assault. Tanks of 7 Lancer Regiment and 19th Lancers were used for the rescue. Italian General Loi said Italian troops had picked up 30 of the wounded Pakistani soldiers. The city's two main hospitals reported that 23 Somalis had been killed and that more than 100 had been wounded.

Malaysia
Lance Corporal Mat Aznan Awang was a 33-year-old soldier of the 19th Battalion, Royal Malay Regiment of the Malaysian Army (posthumously promoted to Corporal). Driving a Malaysian Condor armoured personnel carrier, he was killed when his vehicle was hit by an RPG in the early hours of 4 October. Corporal Mat Aznan Awang was awarded the Seri Pahlawan Gagah Perkasa medal (Gallant Warrior/Warrior of Extreme Valor).

Military fallout 

In a national security policy review session held in the White House on 6 October 1993, U.S. President Bill Clinton directed the Acting Chairman of the Joint Chiefs of Staff, Admiral David E. Jeremiah, to stop all actions by U.S. forces against Aidid except those required in self-defense. He reappointed Ambassador Robert B. Oakley as special envoy to Somalia in an attempt to broker a peace settlement and then announced that all U.S. forces would withdraw from Somalia no later than 31 March 1994. On 15 December 1993, U.S. Secretary of Defense Les Aspin stepped down, taking much of the blame for his decision to refuse requests for tanks and armored vehicles in support of the mission. Garrison would write, however, that Aspin was not to blame for the events in Mogadishu. It's also since been noted that the equipment may not have arrived in time to make a difference. A few hundred U.S. Marines remained offshore to assist with any noncombatant evacuation mission that might occur regarding the 1,000-plus U.S. civilians and military advisers remaining as part of the U.S. liaison mission. The Ready Battalion of the 24th Infantry Division, 1–64 Armor, composed 1,300 troops of Task Force Rogue, including the bulk of 1-64 Armor and Infantry troops from her sister battalion 3-15 Infantry. This was the first time M1 Abrams tanks were delivered by air, using the C-5 Galaxies, which delivered 18 M1 tanks and 44 Bradley infantry vehicles, while the balance of Task Force Rogues equipment and vehicles were delivered via a roll-on/roll-off ship sent from Fort Stewart (Hinesville), Georgia, to Mogadishu to provide armored support for U.S. forces.

On 4 February 1994, the U.N. Security Council passed Resolution 897, which set a process for completing the UNOSOM II mission by March 1995, with the withdrawal of U.N. troops from Somalia at that time. In August 1994, the U.N. requested that the U.S. lead a coalition to aid in the final withdrawal of the UNOSOM II forces from Somalia. On 16 December 1994, Operation United Shield was approved by President Clinton and launched on 14 January 1995. On 7 February 1995, the Operation United Shield multi-national fleet arrived and began the withdrawal of UNOSOM II's forces. On 6 March 1995, all of the remaining U.N. troops were withdrawn, ending UNOSOM II.

Policy changes and political implications
The United Nation's three consecutive humanitarian missions in Somalia (UNOSOM I 1992, UNITAF 1992–1993, UNISOM II 1993–1995) were seen by many as a failure, and the evolving civil war that began in 1986 continues as of 2020. The Clinton administration in particular endured considerable criticism for the operation's outcome. The main elements of the criticism surround: the administration's decision to leave the region before completing the operation's humanitarian and security objectives; the perceived failure to recognize the threat al-Qaeda elements posed in the region; and the threat against U.S. security interests at home. Critics claim that Osama bin Laden and other members of al-Qaeda provided support and training to Mohammed Farrah Aidid's forces. Osama bin Laden even denigrated the administration's decision to prematurely depart the region, stating that it displayed "the weakness, feebleness and cowardliness of the U.S. soldier".

The loss of U.S. military personnel during the Battle of Mogadishu and television images of American soldiers being dragged through the streets by Somalis evoked public outcry. The Clinton administration responded by scaling down U.S. humanitarian efforts in the region.

On 26 September 2006, in an interview on Fox News with Chris Wallace, former President Bill Clinton gave his version of events surrounding the mission in Somalia. Clinton defended his exit strategy for U.S. forces and denied that the departure was premature. He said he had resisted calls from conservative Republicans for an immediate departure: "...[Conservative Republicans] were all trying to get me to withdraw from Somalia in 1993 the next day after we were involved in 'Black Hawk Down,' and I refused to do it and stayed six months and had an orderly transfer to the United Nations."

Clinton's remarks would suggest the U.S. was not deterred from pursuing their humanitarian goals because of the loss of U.S. forces during the battle. In the same interview, he stated that, at the time, there was "not a living soul in the world who thought that Osama bin Laden had anything to do with Black Hawk down or was paying any attention to it or even knew al-Qaeda was a growing concern in October of '93", and that the mission was strictly humanitarian.

Fear of a repeat of the events in Somalia shaped U.S. policy in subsequent years, with many commentators identifying the Battle of Mogadishu's graphic consequences as the key reason behind the U.S.'s decision to not intervene in later conflicts such as the Rwandan genocide of 1994. According to the U.S.'s former deputy special envoy to Somalia, Walter Clarke: "The ghosts of Somalia continue to haunt U.S. policy. Our lack of response in Rwanda was a fear of getting involved in something like a Somalia all over again." Likewise, during the Iraq War when four American contractors were killed in the city of Fallujah, then dragged through the streets and desecrated by an angry mob, direct comparisons by the American media to the Battle of Mogadishu led to the First Battle of Fallujah.

Alleged links with Al-Qaeda
Osama bin Laden's Al-Qaeda organization has been alleged to have been involved in the training and funding of Aidid's men. In his book Holy War, Inc. (2001), CNN reporter Peter Bergen interviewed bin Laden, who affirmed these allegations. According to Bergen, bin Laden asserted that fighters affiliated with his group were involved in killing U.S. troops in Somalia in 1993, a claim he had made earlier to the Arabic newspaper Al-Quds Al-Arabi. The al-Qaeda fighters in Somalia are rumored to have included the organization's military chief, Mohammed Atef, later killed by U.S. forces in Afghanistan. Another al-Qaeda operative who was present at the battle was Zachariah al-Tunisi, who allegedly fired an RPG that downed one of the Black Hawk helicopters; he was later killed by an airstrike in Afghanistan in November 2001.

Four and a half years after the Battle of Mogadishu, in an interview in May 1998, bin Laden disparaged the withdrawal of U.S. troops from Somalia. While he had previously claimed responsibility for the ambush, bin Laden denied having orchestrated the attack on the U.S. soldiers in Mogadishu but expressed delight at their deaths in battle against Somali fighters.

American war correspondent Scott Peterson, after extensive interviews with SNA personnel and other Somalis involved in the conflict with UNOSOM wrote, "Somalis laugh at this claim that bin Laden helped them and say—unanimously—that they never even heard of bin Laden until he began boasting about Somalia years later."

Aidid's men received some expert guidance in shooting down helicopters from fundamentalist Islamic soldiers, possibly from members of al-Qaeda, who had experience fighting Russian helicopters during the Soviet–Afghan War. A document recovered from al-Qaeda operative Wadih el-Hage's computer "made a tentative link between al-Qaeda and the killing of American servicemen in Somalia," and were used to indict bin Laden in June 1998. Al-Qaeda defector Jamal al-Fadl also claimed that the group had trained the men responsible for shooting down the U.S. helicopters.

In a 2011 interview, Moktar Ali Zubeyr, the leader of the Somali militant Islamist group Al-Shabaab, said that three al-Qaeda leaders were present during the battle of Mogadishu. Zubeyr named Yusef al-Ayeri, Saif al-Adel, and Sheikh Abu al Hasan al-Sa'idi as providing help through training or participating in the battle themselves.

Published accounts
In 1999, writer Mark Bowden published the book Black Hawk Down: A Story of Modern War, which chronicles the events that surrounded the battle. The book was based on his series of columns for The Philadelphia Inquirer about the battle and the men who fought.

Falcon Brigade: Combat and Command in Somalia and Haiti, by Lawrence E. Casper (Col. USA Ret.), was published in 2001 by Lynne Rienner Publishers, Inc. Boulder, Colorado and London, England. Casper was the 10th Mountain Division's Falcon Brigade and QRF Commander during the TF Ranger rescue effort. Eleven months later, Falcon Brigade, under Casper's leadership, launched Army forces from the Navy aircraft carrier Eisenhower onto the shores of Haiti in an operation to reinstate Haitian President Aristide.

Black Hawk pilot Michael Durant told his story of being shot down and captured by a mob of Somalis in his 2003 book In the Company of Heroes.

In 2011, Staff Sergeant Keni Thomas, a U.S. Army Ranger recounted the combat experience in a memoir titled Get It On!: What It Means to Lead the Way.

Howard E. Wasdin's SEAL Team Six (2011) includes a section about his time in Mogadishu including the Pasha CIA safe house and multiple operations including the Battle of Mogadishu where he was severely wounded.

Lieutenant Colonel Michael Whetstone, Company Commander of Charlie Company 2–14 Infantry, published his memoirs of the heroic rescue operation of Task Force Ranger in his book Madness in Mogadishu (2013).

Film
Bowden's book has been adapted into the film Black Hawk Down (2001), produced by Jerry Bruckheimer and directed by Ridley Scott. Like the book, the film describes events surrounding the operation, but there are differences between the book and the film, such as Rangers marking targets at night by throwing strobe lights at them, when in reality the Rangers marked their own positions and close air support targeted everything else.

Malaysian film Bakara, directed by Adrian Teh, retells the story of Malaysian contingent of UNOSOM II involvement during the rescue operation in the battle.

Documentaries
The American series PBS Frontline aired a documentary titled Ambush in Mogadishu in 1998.

The True Story of Black Hawk Down (2003) is a TV documentary which premièred on The History Channel. It was directed by David Keane.

The American Heroes Channel television series, Black Ops, aired an episode titled "The Real Black Hawk Down" in June 2014.

The National Geographic Channel television series, No Man Left Behind, aired an episode titled "The Real Black Hawk Down" on 28 June 2016.

The Seconds from Disaster television series spotlighted the raid-and-rescue mission in the season 7 episode "Chopper Down", which aired in February 2018.

Rangers return in 2013
In March 2013, two survivors from Task Force Ranger returned to Mogadishu with a film crew to shoot a short film, Return to Mogadishu: Remembering Black Hawk Down, which debuted in October 2013 on the 20th anniversary of the battle. Author Jeff Struecker and country singer-songwriter Keni Thomas relived the battle as they drove through the Bakaara Market in armored vehicles and visited the Wolcott crash site.

Super 61 returns to US
In August 2013, remains of Super 61, consisting of the mostly intact main rotor and parts of the nose section, were extracted from the crash site and returned to the United States due to the efforts of David Snelson and Alisha Ryu, and are on display at the Airborne & Special Operations Museum at Fort Bragg, Fayetteville, North Carolina. The exhibit features immersive dioramas and artifacts from the battle including the wreckage of Super 61, the first Black Hawk helicopter shot down during the battle, and Super 64.

As of October 2018, a fully restored Super 68 is on display at the Army Aviation Museum in Fort Rucker, Alabama.

Notes

References

Bibliography
 Allard, Colonel Kenneth, Somalia Operations: Lessons Learned, National Defense University Press (1995).
 Boykin, William (Maj. Gen.), Never Surrender, Faith Words, New York, NY, (2008).
 Chun, Clayton K.S., Gothic Serpent: Black Hawk Down, Mogadishu 1993. Osprey Raid Series #31. Osprey Publishing (2012). 
 Clarke, Walter, and Herbst, Jeffrey, editors, Learning from Somalia: The Lessons of Armed Humanitarian Intervention, Westview Press (1997).
 Dauber, Cori Elizabeth. "The shot seen 'round the world': The impact of the images of Mogadishu on American military operations." Rhetoric & Public Affairs 4.4 (2001): 653-687 online.
 Durant, Michael (CWO4), In the Company of Heroes, (2003 hb, 2006 pb).
 Gardner, Judith and el Bushra, Judy, editors, Somalia – The Untold Story: The War Through the Eyes of Somali Women, Pluto Press (2004).
 O'Connell, James Patrick (SGT.), Survivor Gun Battle Mogadishu, U.S. Army SOC Attached. (New York City) (1993).
 Prestowitz, Clyde, Rogue Nation: American Unilateralism and the Failure of Good Intentions, Basic Books (2003).
 Sangvic, Roger, Battle of Mogadishu: Anatomy of a Failure, School of Advanced Military Studies, U.S. Army Command and General Staff College (1998).
 Stevenson, Jonathan, Losing Mogadishu: Testing U.S. Policy in Somalia, Naval Institute Press (1995).
 Stewart, Richard W., The United States Army in Somalia, 1992–1994, United States Army Center of Military History (2003).
 Somalia: Good Intentions, Deadly Results, VHS, produced by KR Video and The Philadelphia Inquirer (1998).

External links

 Black Hawk Down, The Philadelphia Inquirer
 PBS – Ambush in Mogadishu, PBS
 The Borneo Post – Book tells the truth on the 'Black Hawk Down' incident in Mogadishu The Borneo Post

 
1993 in Somalia
20th-century aircraft shootdown incidents
20th century in Mogadishu
20th-century military history of the United States
Aviation accidents and incidents in Somalia
Mogadishu
October 1993 events in Africa
Mogadishu
Mogadishu
Pakistan military presence in other countries
Pakistan–Somalia relations
Somali Civil War
Somalia–United States military relations
United Nations operations in Somalia
United States Army Rangers
Urban warfare
1993 disasters in Somalia